Membrane-type matrix metalloproteinase-1 (matrix metalloproteinase 14) is an enzyme. This enzyme catalyses the following chemical reaction

 Endopeptidase activity. Activates progelatinase A by cleavage of the propeptide at Asn37-Leu. Other bonds hydrolysed include Gly35-Ile in the propeptide of collagenase 3, and Asn341-Phe, Asp441-Leu and Gln354-Thr in the aggrecan interglobular domain

This enzyme belongs to peptidase family M10.

See also 
 Metalloproteinase

References

External links 
 

EC 3.4.24